The 2022 Internationaux de Tennis de Toulouse was a professional tennis tournament played on clay courts. It was the first edition of the tournament which was part of the 2022 ATP Challenger Tour. It took place in Toulouse, France between 29 August and 4 September 2022.

Singles main-draw entrants

Seeds

 1 Rankings are as of 22 August 2022.

Other entrants
The following players received wildcards into the singles main draw:
  Titouan Droguet
  Mathys Erhard
  Arthur Reymond

The following players received entry into the singles main draw as alternates:
  João Domingues
  Ivan Gakhov
  Benjamin Hassan

The following players received entry from the qualifying draw:
  Ugo Blanchet
  Jurgen Briand
  Andrey Chepelev
  Kimmer Coppejans
  Karol Drzewiecki
  Arthur Fils

The following player received entry as a lucky loser:
  Román Andrés Burruchaga

Champions

Singles

  Kimmer Coppejans def.  Maxime Janvier 6–7(8–10), 6–4, 6–3.

Doubles

  Maxime Janvier /  Malek Jaziri def.  Théo Arribagé /  Titouan Droguet 6–3, 7–6(7–5).

References

Internationaux de Tennis de Toulouse
2022 in French sport
August 2022 sports events in France
September 2022 sports events in France
Sport in Toulouse